Happy life expectancy (HLE) is calculated by multiplying life expectancy by a happiness index. The first uses life expectancy at birth. The happiness index is the average appreciation of life (with a value from 0 to 1) from the world databases of happiness.

Quality of life indexes
Arguably, one of the most widely valued social indicators is happiness. Social researchers often use the term quality of life (QOL) to describe what is commonly called "happiness". One of the leading pioneers of happiness research is Ruut Veenhoven (see #References)), emeritus-professor of 'social conditions for human happiness' at Erasmus University Rotterdam in the Netherlands. He is also one of the chief critics of one of the most widely used QOL indexes, the Human Development Index (HDI) published by the United Nations Development Programme (UNDP). His 1996 paper "Happy Life-Expectancy, A Comprehensive Measure of Quality-of Life in Nations", which appeared in the journal Social Indicators Research, proposed an alternative QOL index, called happy life expectancy (HLE). HLE may be a better indicator of happiness as it relies on subjective measures of happiness, as opposed to the largely materialistic measures that go into creating the HDI.

HDI

The HDI measures average achievements based on three dimensions: life-span, as measured by life expectancy at birth; education, as measured by the adult literacy rate and average number of years spent in school in adults over 25; and standard of living, as measured by GDP per capita in purchasing power parity (PPP) terms in US dollars. Veenhoven is critical of the HDI because it measures QOL in terms of input, while never addressing to what extent these input provisions are in fact good for people. Furthermore, the HDI is a rather generalized index that gives a simple average of the three-dimensional achievements mentioned above, which can be expressed in this formula:
HDI = 1/3 (life expectancy index) + 1/3 (education index) + 1/3 (GDP index).

One can see that highly developed nations can have high life expectancy rates if those nations rely on excessive measures to keep a person alive. The HDI however does not account for the HOW of a particular dimension, but merely the NET RESULT. In the HDI, a hypothetical nation that had a life expectancy of say 100, would score very highly, regardless of how this nation sustained life. Using the actual HDI for 2004, China ranked number 22 out of 177 nations included in the HDI, right behind Germany (number 21 in the 2004 HDI). One of the reasons China ranked so highly was because its GDP was very high, although its education index and life expectancy are low when compared to other nations, such as the United States, Japan, or Germany.

HLE
"The most fundamental problem with this generation of QOL's," writes Veenhoven, "... is that they do not distinguish between means and ends, nor between societal input and societal output." "Economic affluence," he writes, "can hardly be seen as an end in itself." HLE does not mix means and ends; but rather, looks at societal output specifically. For example, while current QOL-indices will look at 'healthcare' and 'health' as a single indicator, HLE focuses on the ends, 'health.' This makes HLE a more specific index than traditional QOL-indices. The output centric method of HLE is also one of its shortcomings. Veenhoven says, "it is of little help in daily piecemeal decision making." He adds, "Because it is a long-term measure, it reacts slowly... it is more analogous to climate change than to the weather."

HLE, better QOL gauge
Nonetheless, the HLE may prove to be a better gauge and social tool in accessing what political and social policies can actually make a nation's peoples happier in the long run. HLE uses eight 'nation characteristics' when calculating the 'happy life-expectancy.' These criteria (which are further individuated into more subjective determinants within the larger category) are: affluence, security, freedom, social equality, cultural climate, social climate, modernization, population pressure. In determining HLE scores, Veenhoven multiplied standard-life expectancy by a happiness index correlated from the eight characteristics listed above. Iceland had the highest HLE observed by Veenhoven's method, while Bulgaria had the lowest. The HLE was not found to be related to unemployment, state welfare, or income equality, nor to religiousness and trust in institutions.

HDI, top 5 countries
There are startling differences between the QOL-indexes as reported by Veenhoven's method and those of the dominant QOL, the United Nation's HDI. In 1996 the nations with the highest HDI were:

 Canada
 USA
 Japan
 Netherlands
 Norway

More recently, in 2021, the nations with the highest HDI were:

 Switzerland
 Norway
 Iceland
 Hong Kong, China (SAR)
 Australia

HLE, top 5 countries
In that same year, (1996) the nations with the highest HLE were:

 Iceland
 Netherlands
 Sweden
 Switzerland
 Australia

The USA ranked 10th on the 1996 HLE scale.

References

External links 
 http://www2.eur.nl/fsw/research/veenhoven/Pub1990s/96b-full.pdf 
 http://www.eoearth.org/article/Human_Development_Index 
 http://hdr.undp.org/en/media/hdr_1996_en_indicators1.pdf

Happiness indices
Welfare economics
Quality of life